Lankford Daniel Smith (21 December 1914 – 28 November 1978) was a football (soccer) player who represented New Zealand at international level. He was also an accomplished cricketer, playing first-class cricket for Otago from 1935 to 1957.

Life and career
Born in Ngaio, Wellington, Smith moved to Dunedin with his parents, Daniel and Annie Smith sometime prior to October 1925, where his father worked as a hospital orderly. He married Mavis Lucy Madigan in October 1937. 

Smith played association football for Northern AFC, and played two official A-international matches for the New Zealand national football team in 1948, both against the visiting Australian team, the first a 0–7 loss on 28 August, followed by a 0–4 loss on 4 September.

A middle-order batsman and left-arm spinner, Smith captained Otago in 1945-46 and from 1947–48 to 1955–56, leading the province to victory in the Plunket Shield in 1947–48, 1950–51, and 1952–53. In 62 first-class matches he scored 2281 runs at 24.52, and took 85 wickets at 38.23. He scored his only century in the victory over Central Districts in Dunedin that gave Otago the 1952-53 shield. Dick Brittenden said that apart from his batting, bowling and "inspiring example in the field", "perhaps his greatest asset as a captain was his firm belief in the ability of his team. He was so deeply convinced it was the better side that it very often was."

After his playing career was over, Smith served as a Test selector. He was also a cricket commentator on radio, in partnership with Iain Gallaway, when major matches were played at the Carisbrook ground in Dunedin.

Smith worked as a schoolteacher. In December 1965 he rescued two boys who had got into difficulty in the sea near the mouth of the Waikouaiti River, and almost drowned himself while trying unsuccessfully to rescue a third. He, and the man who rescued him, were awarded the Royal Humane Society's bronze medal for bravery.

See also
 List of Otago representative cricketers

References

External links
 
 Lankford Smith at Cricket Archive

1914 births
1978 deaths
New Zealand association footballers
New Zealand international footballers
New Zealand cricketers
Otago cricketers
Association football forwards
New Zealand Services cricketers
South Island cricketers
New Zealand cricket commentators
Cricketers from Dunedin
Association footballers from Dunedin
Cricketers from Wellington City
Association footballers from Wellington City